Kildare College is a Catholic secondary day college for girls in Years 7-12, located in the Adelaide suburb of Holden Hill, South Australia, Australia. The school works under the governance of Kildare Education Ministries and was established, based on an invitation by the Archbishop of Adelaide, in 1966.

Houses 
Kildare has five houses
Brigid (yellow): Named for Brigid, a fifth-century Irish saint, renowned for her hospitality and compassion whose first monastery was established at Kildare.
Delany (red): Named for the bishop of the diocese of Kildare and Leighlin who founded the Brigidine Sisters in Tullow in 1807.
Kildare (blue): The diocese in Ireland whose patron saint is St Brigid and in which the Brigidine head house is situated.
Chanel (white): Sister Chanel Gough was the first Australian Brigidine sister to become Superior General of the Brigidine Sisters, who held this position when Kildare College was established in 1966.
Nagle (purple): Named for Honora "Nano" Nagle founded the "Sisters of the Presentation of the Blessed Virgin Mary" in Ireland and was a pioneer of Catholic education in Ireland. Nagle House was established in 2018

Uniform 
Kildare has two uniform sets - summer and winter.

The summer uniform (worn in Term 1 and Term 4) consists of a striped dress, blazer (compulsory), green jumper, white socks and black footwear.

The winter uniform (worn in Term 2 and 3) consists of a Kildare kilt, green jumper, white blouse, green tie, blazer (compulsory), black tights or white socks, and black footwear.

PE uniforms are similar, but consist of a white polo shirt and track pants or shorts.

House tops or house-coded dress-up clothes are worn on Sports Day and at the Swimming Carnival.

See also

References

External links 
 Kildare College website

Educational institutions established in 1966
Catholic secondary schools in Adelaide
Girls' schools in South Australia
1966 establishments in Australia
Brigidine schools
Alliance of Girls' Schools Australasia